Hall, Russell & Company, Limited was a shipbuilder based in Aberdeen, Scotland.

History

Brothers James and William Hall, Thomas Russell, a Glasgow engineer, and James Cardno Couper founded the company in 1864 to build steam engines and boilers. In 1867 the company built its first ship, the Kwang Tung, for the Imperial Chinese Navy. Like most shipyards of their era, Hall Russell built ships first using iron and later changing to steel.

In 1944–45 Hall, Russell built five coasters under sub-contract for the Burntisland Shipbuilding Company of Fife: hull numbers 773, 776, 781, 785 and 788. In 1956–57 Hall, Russell built two more coasters for Burntisland: hull 750 launched as SS Winga and hull 857 launched as William Cory & Son's MV Corsea.

In 1977 the company became part of the nationalised British Shipbuilders Corporation, before being returned to the private sector in 1986. Having been placed in receivership in 1988, it came under the ownership of A&P Appledore International in 1989, as A&P Appledore International (Aberdeen). However, it had been classed by the Government as a naval shipbuilder, despite traditionally producing fishing vessels and small cargo ships, and closed in 1992.

In the Second World War Hall Russell built a number of Royal Navy s and s. After the war the company built fishing vessels, cargo ships and naval patrol craft.

The most widely known ship built by Hall Russell was MV Sir William Hardy. Launched in 1955, she was the first diesel-electric all-refrigerated trawler built in the UK. Refurbished by Greenpeace, she was renamed on 29 April 1978 the Rainbow Warrior. She was bombed by French agents in New Zealand 10 July 1985. Her masts currently stand outside the Dargaville Museum in the upper North Island, New Zealand.

They were builder of Island-class OPV. The class is still in active service with Bangladesh Navy. MY Steve Irwin was the flagship of the Sea Shepherd Conservation Society, and was used in their direct action campaigns against whaling and against illegal fisheries activities.

They were also builder of Castle-class OPV. The ships of the class are now in active service with Bangladesh Navy. These are now reclassified as corvettes by the Bangladesh Navy.

Gallery

See also
List of ships built by Hall, Russell & Company
Hall Russell United F.C. (Junior football club based in Bridge of Don)

References and sources
References

Sources

Companies based in Aberdeen
Defunct shipbuilding companies of Scotland
Companies established in 1864
1864 establishments in Scotland
Defunct companies of Scotland
Vehicle manufacturing companies disestablished in 1992
Ships built by Hall, Russell & Company
British companies established in 1864
Manufacturing companies established in 1864
British Shipbuilders